Mukasura is an asura featured in the Indian epic Mahabharata.

Legend 

In the Kairata Parva of the Mahabharata, Arjuna ascends the Indrakila mountain to perform a penance to please Shiva, for obtaining the deity's personal weapon, called the pashupatastra. He is attacked by a danava named Muka, who had assumed the form of a boar. Arjuna proclaims that he means no harm to the beast, but would slay it in self-defence. Shiva, disguised as a kirata (hunter), shouts at the prince to stop, stating that he had aimed at the creature first. Both of their arrows strike Mukasura at the same moment, killing him. Arjuna angrily accuses the hunter of breaking the law of the hunt and attacks him. The two exchange arrows, and Arjuna finds that he is no match for his opponent. To propitiate Shiva, Arjuna creates an earthen lingam and decorates it with a garland. He is moved by joy when the garland appears around the hunter's head, realising his true identity. Shiva appreciates the valour of Arjuna and grants him the boon of the missile.

References 
Asura
Danavas
Characters in the Mahabharata